The 2003–04 NBA season was the Warriors' 58th season in the National Basketball Association, and 42nd season in the San Francisco Bay Area. During the offseason, the Warriors acquired Nick Van Exel from the Dallas Mavericks, and Clifford Robinson from the Detroit Pistons while signing free agents Calbert Cheaney and Speedy Claxton. The Warriors began to show they were turning the corner as they got off to a 14–13 start. However, as the New Year began, they went on a 7-game losing streak. Despite a nine-game losing streak between February and March, the Warriors would then win seven straight games. However, they yet again missed the playoffs by finishing fifth in the Pacific Division with a 37–45 record tied with the Seattle SuperSonics. Despite their record, the Warriors were very successful at home posting a 27–14 record at The Arena in Oakland. Following the season, head coach Eric Musselman was fired, Van Exel was traded to the Portland Trail Blazers, and Erick Dampier was traded to the Dallas Mavericks as the Warriors were unable to re-sign him.

Draft

Roster

Roster Notes
 Center Evan Eschmeyer missed the entire season due to a knee injury.

Regular season

Season standings

Record vs. opponents

Game log

|- style="background:#fbb;"
| 1
| October 29
| Dallas
| L 87–95
| Clifford Robinson (18)
| Erick Dampier (17)
| Avery Johnson (6)
| The Arena in Oakland15,816
| 0–1

|- style="background:#bfb;"
| 2
| November 1
| Philadelphia
| W 104–90
| Mike Dunleavy Jr. (32)
| Mike Dunleavy Jr. (11)
| Avery Johnson (5)
| The Arena in Oakland16,594
| 1–1
|- style="background:#fbb;"
| 3
| November 2
| @ L.A. Lakers
| L 72–87
| Clifford Robinson (19)
| Erick Dampier (23)
| Clifford Robinson (7)
| Staples Center18,997
| 1–2
|- style="background:#bfb;"
| 4
| November 5
| Atlanta
| W 90–72
| Jason Richardson (16)
| Erick Dampier (18)
| Nick Van Exel (6)
| The Arena in Oakland10,453
| 2–2
|- style="background:#bfb;"
| 5
| November 7
| Utah
| W 95–89
| Jason Richardson (21)
| Erick Dampier (11)
| Nick Van Exel (9)
| The Arena in Oakland11,642
| 3–2
|- style="background:#fbb;"
| 6
| November 10
| Phoenix
| L 96–99
| Jason Richardson (22)
| Mike Dunleavy Jr. (10)
| Van Exel, Dunleavy Jr. (6)
| The Arena in Oakland13,278
| 3–3
|- style="background:#bfb;"
| 7
| November 12
| Detroit
| W 87–85
| Calbert Cheaney (24)
| Erick Dampier (14)
| Nick Van Exel (9)
| The Arena in Oakland14,382
| 4–3
|- style="background:#fbb;"
| 8
| November 14
| L.A. Clippers
| L 98–104
| Brian Cardinal (24)
| Erick Dampier (16)
| Nick Van Exel (10)
| The Arena in Oakland13,122
| 4–4
|- style="background:#fbb;"
| 9
| November 16
| @ Sacramento
| L 104–106
| Jason Richardson (31)
| Erick Dampier (15)
| Speedy Claxton (7)
| ARCO Arena17,317
| 4–5
|- style="background:#fbb;"
| 10
| November 18
| @ San Antonio
| L 81–94
| Erick Dampier (17)
| Erick Dampier (11)
| Van Exel, Claxton (4)
| SBC Center17,098
| 4–6
|- style="background:#fbb;"
| 11
| November 19
| @ Houston
| L 83–85
| Clifford Robinson (23)
| Erick Dampier (12)
| Speedy Claxton (8)
| Toyota Center10,888
| 4–7
|- style="background:#bfb;"
| 12
| November 21
| Miami
| W 110–91
| Jason Richardson (29)
| Mike Dunleavy Jr. (14)
| Jason Richardson (6)
| The Arena in Oakland12,869
| 5–7
|- style="background:#bfb;"
| 13
| November 23
| Portland
| W 78–72
| Jason Richardson (21)
| Erick Dampier (17)
| Cardinal, Claxton (4)
| The Arena in Oakland14,332
| 6–7
|- style="background:#bfb;"
| 14
| November 28
| @ Phoenix
| W 92–83
| Jason Richardson (25)
| Jason Richardson (13)
| Clifford Robinson (5)
| The Arena in Oakland15,826
| 7–7
|- style="background:#bfb;"
| 15
| November 29
| San Antonio
| W 91–89
| Nick Van Exel (29)
| Erick Dampier (16)
| 4 players tied (2)
| The Arena in Oakland17,680
| 8–7

|- style="background:#fbb;"
| 16
| December 3
| Denver
| L 109–117
| Speedy Claxton (21)
| Erick Dampier (18)
| Nick Van Exel (8)
| The Arena in Oakland16,147
| 8–8
|- style="background:#fbb;"
| 17
| December 5
| @ Denver
| L 91–98
| Mike Dunleavy Jr. (19)
| Erick Dampier (11)
| Nick Van Exel (9)
| Pepsi Center17,512
| 8–9
|- style="background:
| 18
| December 6
| New York
|
|
|
|
| The Arena in Oakland
|
|- style="background:
| 19
| December 9
| @ Minnesota
|
|
|
|
| Target Center
|
|- style="background:
| 20
| December 10
| @ Milwaukee
|
|
|
|
| Bradley Center
|
|- style="background:
| 21
| December 12
| New Orleans
|
|
|
|
| The Arena in Oakland
|
|- style="background:
| 22
| December 16
| @ New York
|
|
|
|
| Madison Square Garden
|
|- style="background:
| 23
| December 17
| @ Atlanta
|
|
|
|
| Philips Arena
|
|- style="background:
| 24
| December 19
| @ Orlando
|
|
|
|
| TD Waterhouse Centre
|
|- style="background:
| 25
| December 21
| @ Miami
|
|
|
|
| American Airlines Arena
|
|- style="background:
| 26
| December 23
| L.A. Lakers
|
|
|
|
| The Arena in Oakland
|
|- style="background:
| 27
| December 26
| Sacramento
|
|
|
|
| The Arena in Oakland
|
|- style="background:
| 28
| December 28
| @ Denver
|
|
|
|
| Pepsi Center
|
|- style="background:
| 29
| December 29
| Boston
|
|
|
|
| The Arena in Oakland
|
|- style="background:
| 30
| December 31
| @ New Jersey
|
|
|
|
| Continental Airlines Arena
|

Player statistics

Player stats

Transactions

Trades

Free agents

References

Golden State Warriors seasons
Golden State Warriors
Golden State Warriors
Golden State Warriors